The 1995–96 season are the Esteghlal Football Club's 4th season in the Azadegan League, and their 2nd consecutive season in the top division of Iranian football. They are also competing in the Hazfi Cup and Asian Club Championship, and 51st year in existence as a football club.

Player
As of 29 September 2018.

Pre-season and friendlies

Competitions

Overview

Azadegan League

Standings

Hazfi Cup

Round of 16

1/8 finals

Quarterfinals

Semifinal

Final

See also
 1995–96 Azadegan League
 1995–96 Hazfi Cup

References

External links
 RSSSF

1995–96
Esteghlal